B. typica may refer to:

 Ballognatha typica, a spider species found in Karakorum
 Berthelinia typica, a sea snail species

See also
 Typica (disambiguation)